The Lithuania women's national 3x3 basketball team is the basketball side that represents Lithuania in international 3x3 basketball (3 against 3) competitions. It is organized and run by the Lithuanian Basketball Federation.

World Cup record

See also
 Lithuania women's national basketball team

References

External links
Official website

3x3
Women's national 3x3 basketball teams